Admiral Hood may refer to::

 Samuel Hood, 1st Viscount Hood (1724–1816), English Royal Navy officer
 Alexander Hood, 1st Viscount Bridport (1726–1814), British Royal Navy officer
 Sir Samuel Hood, 1st Baronet (1762–1814), British Royal Navy officer
 Arthur Hood, 1st Baron Hood of Avalon (1824–1901), English Royal Navy officer 
 Horace Hood (1870–1916), English Royal Navy admiral
 John Hood (naval officer) (1859–1919), US Navy officer
 Admiral Hood Monument, in Somerset, England
 , Royal Navy battlecruiser